Niehoff is a surname. Notable people with this surname include:

 Bert Niehoff (1884–1974), Americal baseball player
 Domenica Niehoff (1945–2009), German prostitute and activist
 Hendrik Niehoff (1495-1561), Dutch pipe organ builder
 Hermann Niehoff (1897–1980), German general
 Robert L. Niehoff (born 1953), American clergyman